Amal Iyingiala Pepple, CFR, was the Minister of Housing, Land and Urban Development of the Federal Republic of Nigeria. Until June 2009, she was the Head of the Civil Service.

Amal Inyingiala Pepple was born on June 16, 1949 to the Perekule Royal House in Grand Bonny Island in Rivers State.
She attended Archdeacon Crowther Memorial Girls' School Elelenwa, Port Harcourt, Nigeria for her O Levels and proceeded to the College of Further Education, Bath Lane, Newcastle-Upon Tyne, England for her A Levels.
After her A Levels, she proceeded to the University of Ile-Ife, Nigeria for University Education where she read Political Science and graduated with first class honors. In 1981, she acquired her Master of Science Degree from the School of Oriental & African studies, University of London, UK. She did her Youth Service in NBC, Port Harcourt and then began her working career as Lecturer in Political Science at the Rivers State College of Education.

In 1992, she was appointed the Clerk of the Senate of the National Assembly, where she began her Federal Civil Service Career. She meritoriously served in the Federal Civil Service, culminating in her being appointed as a Permanent Secretary in 1999. She served in that capacity in several Ministries, such as the Federal Civil Service Commission, Ministry of Transport, Ministry of Information and National Orientation, Ministry of Petroleum Resources, Ministry of Commerce, Ministry of Agriculture and Rural Development and Ministry of Finance. While serving in these Ministries, she held the following positions: Governor of OPEC for Nigeria, Governor Common Fund for Commodities, Alternate Governor International Fund for Agricultural Development (IFAD), Governor OPEC fund for International Development, Alternate Governor Islamic Development Bank, Alternate Governor African Development Bank, Alternate Governor International Monetary Fund. She is also a Board Member of Commonwealth Association for Public Administration and Management (CAPAM), a Director in Zenith PLC and Oando PLC until her Ministerial Appointment.

On 16 June 2008, she was appointed the Head of Civil Service of the Federation. She is an Awardee of the National Honour of Commander of the Federal Republic of Nigeria (CFR). As a reward for excellence and dedicated service to her fatherland, the President of the Federal Republic of Nigeria, Dr Goodluck Ebele Jonathan, found her worthy and appointed her a Minister of the Government of the Federal Republic of Nigeria in July 2011 and assigned her the portfolio of the Honourable Minister of Lands, Housing and Urban Development.

Prior to joining the Government, Pepple started her career as a Lecturer in Political Science at Rivers State College of Education, Port Harcourt Rivers State. Pepple has also served as Administrative Secretary of the Social Democratic Party, Rivers State. She has also been Director of the Federal Civil Service and Director of the Economic Affairs Office in the Presidency as well as Permanent Secretary in the following Federal Ministries: Civil Service Commission, Transport, Information and National Orientation, Petroleum Resources, Commerce, Agriculture and Water Resources and Finance.

References 

 https://web.archive.org/web/20100809031455/http://www.capam.org/boardofdirectors/
 https://web.archive.org/web/20101206034538/http://www.arksego.com/our_people.php

Living people
Nigerian politicians
Obafemi Awolowo University alumni
Year of birth missing (living people)